The south Indian city of Chennai is fast emerging as a destination for information technology outsourcing and has seen a growing number of IT parks being built here. Most of the upcoming complexes are being built along the I T Corridor and the southern suburb.

List

References 

Software technology parks in Chennai
Chennai-related lists